Diana Buzean and Daniëlle Harmsen were the defending champions, having won the event in 2012, but both players chose not to compete in 2013.

Cindy Burger and Daniela Seguel won the title, defeating Demi Schuurs and Eva Wacanno in the final, 6–4, 6–1.

Seeds

Draw

References 
 Draw

Tean International - Women's Doubles
2013 Women's Doubles
2013 in Dutch tennis